María Armand (born March 22, 1917) was an Argentine dancer, stage and film actress. She appeared in around thirty films during her career. Her sister was the stage actress Ángela Armand.

Filmography

1938: The Gossiper
1938: Jettatore
1939: Affluent People
1941: Un bebé de París
1941: El tesoro de la isla Maciel
1945: Swan Song
1945: Allá en el setenta y tantos
1946: Inspiración
1947: Los verdes paraísos
1948: Porteña de corazón
1949: The Story of the Tango
1950: Valentina
1950: Abuso de confianza
1951: Cartas de amor
1951: La calle junto a la luna
1953: The Best of the School
1955: Para vestir santos
1958: La hermosa mentira
1960: La Casa de la Troya (TV series,  (39 episodes)
1961: El sí de las niñas (TV Series 19 episodes)
1961: La maestra enamorada
1961: El mago de las finanzas
1962: Señorita Medianoche (TV series, 39 episodes)
1963: Canuto Cañete, conscripto del 7
1963: Canuto Cañete y los 40 ladrones
1964: Cuando calienta el sol
1964: Cuidado con las colas
1965: Disloque en el presidio
1966: Buenos Aires, Summer 1912
1970: Con alma y vida
1970: With Life and Soul

References

Bibliography 
Pellettieri, Osvaldo.  Dos escenarios: intercambio teatral entre España y la Argentina. Editorial Galerna, 2006.

External links 
 

1917 births
Year of death unknown
Argentine film actresses
Argentine stage actresses
Argentine female dancers